Mike Milosh, known professionally as Milosh, (born 1976) is a Canadian electronic musician from Toronto, who is currently based in Los Angeles, California.

Career
Milosh started learning classical cello at age three, later taking up drumming. He studied jazz and vocals at university.

The Los Angeles-based record label Plug Research released two of Milosh's albums, including 2004's You Make Me Feel and 2006's Meme. In 2008, he contributed the track "Then It Happened" to the Ghostly International/Williams Street album Ghostly Swim, which was released as a free digital download. Later that year, he released his third record, iii, with Plug Research in the US and Studio !K7 in the EU. In 2009, he collaborated with Paul Pfisterer on the album New Territory.

In 2010, Milosh formed the band Rhye with Robin Hannibal, and they released their debut album, Woman, in March 2013. Milosh released his fourth solo record, Jetlag, in November 2013, on his own label, Deadly. In July 2017, Rhye issued a single titled "Please", and Milosh announced on social media the release of a second album later that year. In February 2018, Rhye released a follow-up to Woman, titled Blood.

Sexual abuse allegations
In March 2021, Milosh was accused of grooming and sexual abuse by his ex-wife, Alexa Nikolas. She alleged Milosh began grooming her for a sexual relationship when she was 16 years old and he was 33, and that during their marriage, he assaulted her. In August 2021, Nikolas filed a lawsuit against Milosh for sexual battery, gender-based violence, and intentional infliction of emotional distress. In February 2022, Nikolas released court documents against Milosh. Nikolas dropped the lawsuit against Milosh in March 2022.

Discography

Solo
 You Make Me Feel (2004)
 Meme (2006)
 iii  (2008)
 Jetlag (2013)

with Rhye

 The Fall (Remixes) (2012)
 Woman (2013)
 Blood (2018)
 Blood Remixed (2018)
 Spirit (2019)
 Home (2021)

with Paul Pfisterer
 New Territory (2009)

Contributions
 "Break Apart" Migration (Bonobo, 2017)

Compilation appearances
 "Then It Happened" Ghostly Swim (2008)

References

External links
 Milosh blog
 Milosh bandcamp
 Rhye official website
 

Living people
Canadian electronic musicians
Canadian expatriates in the United States
Canadian male singers
Countertenors
Musicians from Toronto
Concordia University alumni
Canadian people of Russian descent
Canadian people of Ukrainian descent
Plug Research artists
1976 births